Shorea henryana (called, along with some other species in the genus Shorea, white meranti) is a species of tree in the family Dipterocarpaceae. It is grows naturally in Laos, Peninsular Malaysia, Myanmar and Vietnam.

References

henryana
Trees of Laos
Trees of Peninsular Malaysia
Trees of Myanmar
Trees of Vietnam
Taxonomy articles created by Polbot